Odontotrochus chlorostomus is a species of sea snail, a marine gastropod mollusk in the family Trochidae, the top snails

This species has several common names: Bland's top shell, floral top shell, Freycinet's top shell, red kelp shell and Tate's top shell.

Description
The size of the adult shell of this species varies between 20 mm and 30 mm. The solid, imperforate shell has a conical shape and is elevated-trochiform,. The first whorls are red, the following reddish-brown, more or less tinged with puff, and in places with olive-green, and sparsely maculate with whitish. The spiral ribs are more or less articulated minutely with whitish. The 8 to 9 whorls are flat or a trifle concave They are acutely carinated with the carina a trifle projecting above the sutures. The upper surface of each whorl is encircled by 10 to 12 spiral lirae. These are only slightly elevated, and show strong, regular oblique striae of increment in the interliral interstices. The base of the shell is flat, with about 10 concentric narrow lirae. These are strongly, regularly radiately striate. The rhomboidal aperture is very oblique, iridescent and sulcate within. The outer and basal lips are edged with green and are plicate-denticulate within. The green columella is curved, ending in a strong tooth at its base.

Distribution
This marine species is endemic to Australia and occurs off South Australia and Western Australia.

References

 Menke, C.T. 1843. Molluscorum Novae Hollandiae Specimen in Libraria Aulica Hahniana. Hannover : Hahniana 46 pp.
 Crosse, H. 1864. Description d'espèces nouvelles provenant de l'Australie meridionale. Journal de Conchyliologie 12: 339–346
 Fischer, P. 1878. Diagnoses Trochorum novorum. Journal de Conchyliologie 26: 62–67
 Tate, R. 1893. Some additions to the list of the Marine Gastropoda of South Australia. Transactions of the Royal Society of South Australia 17(1): 189–202
 Allan, J.K. 1950. Australian Shells: with related animals living in the sea, in freshwater and on the land. Melbourne : Georgian House xix, 470 pp., 45 pls, 112 text figs
 Cotton, B.C. 1959. South Australian Mollusca. Archaeogastropoda. Handbook of the Flora and Fauna of South Australia. Adelaide : South Australian Government Printer 449 pp
 Ludbrook, N.H. 1978. Quaternary molluscs of the western part of the Eucla Basin. Bulletin of the Geological Survey of Western Australia 125: 1–286
 Wilson, B. 1993. Australian Marine Shells. Prosobranch Gastropods. Kallaroo, Western Australia : Odyssey Publishing Vol. 1 408 pp

External links
 Gastropods.com: Odontotrochus chlorostomus

chlorostomus
Gastropods of Australia
Gastropods described in 1843